"Même pas fatigué !!!" is a 2009 song recorded as duet by Magic System and Khaled. It was the lead single from Khaled's album Liberté on which it is the 18th track, and it also appeared on Kore's album Rai'N'B Fever : Même pas fatigué !!! on the second disc. The song stayed at number-one hit for seven non-consecutive weeks in France, becoming Magic System's first topping hit and most successful single in France. It was also much aired on radio.

Music video
A music video was shot being a football game between two amateur teams of celebrities dubbed "Rai'N'B" and "Fever". Rai'N'B wins by 37-34! French footballer Franck Ribéry made a cameo appearance on the music video.

Track listings
 CD single
 "Même pas fatigué !!!" — 
 "Même pas fatigué !!!" (remix club by DJ Djul'S) —

 Digital download
 "Même pas fatigué !!!" — 
 "Même pas fatigué !!!" (remix club by DJ Djul'S) —

Charts

Peak positions

End of year charts

Cover versions 
In 2011,Greek singer Antonis Remos covered the song titled "Κομμένα Πια Τα Δανεικά" ("Loans are over now") for his studio album Kleista Ta Stomata

References

2009 singles
Khaled (musician) songs
Magic System songs
SNEP Top Singles number-one singles
Vocal collaborations
2009 songs